George John Douglas Campbell, 8th and 1st Duke of Argyll  (30 April 1823 – 24 April 1900; styled Marquess of Lorne until 1847), was a Scottish polymath and Liberal statesman. He made a significant geological discovery in the 1850s when his tenant found fossilized leaves embedded among basalt lava on the Island of Mull. He also helped to popularize ornithology and was one of the first to give a detailed account of the principles of bird flight in the hopes of advancing artificial aerial navigation (i.e. flying machines). His literary output was extensive writing on topics varying from science and theology to economy and politics. In addition to this, he served prominently in the administrations of Lord Aberdeen, Lord Palmerston, John Russell and William Gladstone.

Background
Argyll was born at Ardencaple Castle, Dunbartonshire, the second but only surviving son of John Campbell, 7th Duke of Argyll, and his second wife Joan Glassel, the only daughter of John Glassel. Argyll succeeded his father as duke in 1847. With his death he became also hereditary Master of the Household of Scotland and Sheriff of Argyllshire.

Political career

By the time of his succession, Argyll had already obtained notice as a writer of pamphlets on the disruption of the Church of Scotland, which he strove to avert, and he rapidly became prominent on the Liberal side in parliamentary politics. He was a frequent and eloquent speaker in the House of Lords. A close associate of Prince Albert, he served as Lord Privy Seal between 1852 and 1855 in the cabinet of Lord Aberdeen, and then as Postmaster General between 1855 and 1858 in Lord Palmerston's first cabinet. 

He was again Lord Privy Seal between 1859 and 1866 in the second Palmerston administration, and then under Lord Russell's second administration, in which position he was notable as a strong advocate of the Northern cause in the American Civil War.

Argyll was a major catalyst of the Education (Scotland) Act of 1872. Under his leadership in 1866, the Argyll Commission looked into the Scottish schooling system and found it severely inadequate. The report – eventually finished in 1869 – was used to call for education reforms. As a result of this lobbying, the Education Act (Scotland) 1872 was passed making primary school education mandatory in Scotland for children aged between 5 and 13.

In William Ewart Gladstone's first government of 1868 to 1874, Argyll became Secretary of State for India, in which role his refusal to promise support against the Russians to the emir of Afghanistan helped lead to the Second Afghan War. 

Argyll's wife (née Lady Elizabeth Georgiana Leveson-Gower), served as Mistress of the Robes in this government. 

Argyll also played a key role in the establishment of the Royal Indian Engineering College which functioned from 1872 to 1906. This college which was located on the Coopers Hill estate, near Egham was set up in order to train civil engineers for service in the Indian Public Works Department. In 1871, while actually serving in the Cabinet, his son and heir, Lord Lorne, married one of Queen Victoria's daughters, Princess Louise, enhancing his status as a leading grandee.

In 1880 he again served under Gladstone, as Lord Privy Seal, but resigned on 31 March 1881 in protest at Gladstone's Land Bill, claiming it would interfere with the rights of landlords and had been brought in response to terrorism. In 1886, he fully broke with Gladstone over the question of the prime minister's support for Irish Home Rule, although he did not join the Liberal Unionist Party, but pursued an independent course. Having been already Vice Lord Lieutenant from 1847, Argyll held the honorary post of Lord Lieutenant of Argyllshire from 1862 until his death in 1900. He was sworn of the Privy Council in 1853, appointed a Knight of the Thistle in 1856 and a Knight of the Garter in 1883. In 1892 he was created Duke of Argyll in the Peerage of the United Kingdom.

Scholarship
Argyll was also an amateur scientist dedicated to many areas of science. Aside from his own work in ornithology, he wrote on anthropology, evolution, glaciology and economics. He was a leader in the scholarly opposition against Darwinism (1869, 1884b) although he was not against the theory of evolution, Argyll argued instead for theistic evolution. He did argue against the erosive capability of glaciers (1873) and was an important economist (1893) and institutionalist (1884a), in which latter capacity he was quite similar to his political opponent, Benjamin Disraeli.
 
In 1851, he was elected a Fellow of the Royal Society and was appointed Chancellor of the University of St Andrews. Three years later, he became additionally Rector of the University of Glasgow. In 1849 he was elected a Fellow of the Royal Society of Edinburgh and served as its president from 1860 to 1864. In 1855 he became president of the British Association for the Advancement of Science. From 1872 to 1874 he was President of The Geological Society. In 1866, he was a founding member of Britain's first aeronautical society, the Aeronautical Society of Great Britain (later renamed the Royal Aeronautical Society), and served as its president from 1866 to 1895. He was elected a member of the American Antiquarian Society in 1869. In 1886, he was elected as a member to the American Philosophical Society.

Private life
Argyll was married three times. He married firstly Lady Elizabeth Leveson-Gower, eldest daughter of George Sutherland-Leveson-Gower, 2nd Duke of Sutherland, in 1844. They had five sons and seven daughters, being:

John Campbell, 9th Duke of Argyll (6 August 1845 – 2 May 1914), married Princess Louise of the United Kingdom on 21 March 1871.
Lord Archibald Campbell (18 December 1846 – 29 March 1913), married Janey Callander on 12 January 1869. They had two children, including Niall Campbell, 10th Duke of Argyll. 
Lord Walter Campbell (30 July 1848 – 2 May 1889), married Olivia Rowlandson Milns on 14 April 1874. They had two children, including Douglas Walter Campbell, whose son was Ian Campbell, 11th Duke of Argyll.
Lady Edith Campbell (7 November 1849 – 6 July 1913), married Henry Percy, 7th Duke of Northumberland on 23 December 1868. They had thirteen children.
Lord George Granville Campbell (25 December 1850 – 21 April 1915), married Sybil Lascelles Alexander, daughter of James Brace Alexander, on 9 May 1879. They had three children. 
Lady Elisabeth Campbell (14 February 1852 – 24 September 1896) she married Lt.-Col. Edward Harrison Clough-Taylor on 17 July 1880. They had one daughter.
Lord Colin Campbell (9 March 1853 – 18 June 1895), married Gertrude Blood in 1881.
Lady Victoria Campbell (22 May 1854 – 6 July 1910).
Lady Evelyn Campbell (17 August 1855 – 22 March 1940), married James Baillie-Hamilton on 10 August 1886.
Lady Frances Balfour (22 February 1858 – 25 February 1931), married Eustace Balfour on 12 May 1879. They had five children.
Lady Mary Emma Campbell (22 September 1859 – 22 March 1947), married Rt. Rev. Hon. Edward Carr Glyn on 4 July 1882. They had three children.
Lady Constance Harriett Campbell (11 November 1864 – 9 February 1922), married Charles Emmott on 27 June 1891.

The Duchess of Argyll died aged 53 in May 1878. In 1881, Argyll married Amelia Maria (born 1843), daughter of the Right Reverend Thomas Claughton, Bishop of St Albans, and widow of Augustus Anson. She died aged 50 in January 1894. In 1895, Argyll married a third time, to Ina, daughter of Archibald McNeill. Ina survived the duke by a quarter of a century, dying in December 1925. There were no children from either the second or third marriages.

Argyll died at Inveraray Castle in April 1900, six days before his 77th birthday, and is buried at Kilmun Parish Church. He was succeeded in his titles by his eldest son John.

Legacy
Argyll Road in Penang, Malaysia is named in his honour.

Key works

 (1867) The Reign of Law. London: Strahan. (5th Ed. in 1868).
 (1869) Primeval Man: An Examination of some Recent Speculations. New York: Routledge.
 (1873) President's Anniversary Address. Proceedings of the Geological Society. pp. li - lxxviii.
 (1879) The Eastern Question. London: Strahan.
 (1884) The Unity of Nature. New York: Putnam.
 (1887) Scotland As It Was and As It Is
 (1893) The Unseen Foundations of Society. An Examination of the Fallacies and Failures of Economic Science Due to Neglected Elements. London: John Murray.
 (1896) The Philosophy of Belief; Or, Law in Christian Theology 
 (1898) Organic Evolution Cross-Examined 
 (1906) Autobiography and Memoirs

References

External links

1823 births
1900 deaths
19th-century Scottish people
People from Argyll and Bute
British Secretaries of State
Chancellors of the University of St Andrews
8
Peers of the United Kingdom created by Queen Victoria
Fellows of the Royal Society
Knights of the Garter
Knights of the Thistle
Liberal Party (UK) hereditary peers
Lord-Lieutenants of Argyllshire
Lords Privy Seal
Members of the Privy Council of the United Kingdom
Presidents of the Royal Society of Edinburgh
Presidents of the Royal Scottish Geographical Society
Presidents of the Royal Aeronautical Society
Rectors of the University of Glasgow
Scottish economists
Scottish politicians
Scottish scientists
Scottish science writers
Scottish political writers
Scottish non-fiction writers
Secretaries of State for India
United Kingdom Postmasters General
19th-century Scottish landowners
Members of the American Antiquarian Society
G
Members of the American Philosophical Society
19th-century Scottish businesspeople